Barbara Zofia Hyla-Makowska ( Szczygielska, 30 March 1946 – 17 November 2022) was a Polish teacher and politician. A member of the Democratic Left Alliance, she served in the Sejm from 1993 to 2005.

Hyla-Makowska died on 17 November 2022, at the age of 76.

References

1946 births
2022 deaths
Members of the Polish Sejm 1993–1997
Members of the Polish Sejm 1997–2001
Members of the Polish Sejm 2001–2005
Women members of the Sejm of the Republic of Poland
Democratic Left Alliance politicians
Members of Kuyavian-Pomeranian Regional Assembly
Recipients of the Medal of the Commission for National Education
Jan Długosz University alumni
People from Przasnysz County
Polish schoolteachers